Letterlocking is the act of folding and securing a written message (such as a letter) on papyrus, parchment, or paper, without requiring it to be contained in an envelope or packet. It is a traditional method of document security that utilizes folding and cutting. The process dates to the 13th century in Western history, corresponding with the availability of flexible writing paper.  Letterlocking uses small slits, tabs, and holes placed directly into a letter, which combined with folding techniques are used to secure the letter ("letterpacket"), preventing reading the letter without breaking seals or slips, providing a means of tamper resistance and tamper evidence. These folds and holes may be additionally secured with string and sealing wax.

A particularly intricate method known as a spiral lock was in use by people of many social backgrounds in early modern Europe, including monarchs Mary Queen of Scots and Elizabeth I of England. The pages of a letter would be folded together to form a packet. A sliver cut from a page but remaining attached at one end would be woven multiple times, back and forth, through short slots cut into the folded pages. The paper would then be moistened so that it would swell, locking the pieces together. The loose end of the sliver would then be pasted down and possibly sealed with wax.

A Scottish diplomat in Italy, William Keith of Delny, sent letters to James VI of Scotland in 1595 which would tear in two if not opened with care. In 1603 King James told the Venetian diplomat Giovanni Carlo Scaramelli, with a smile, that he had previously received letters from the Doge of Venice which he could not open without breaking the seal. Scaramelli opened the letter for him.

Intricate letterlocking works contain artistic elements, demonstrating more than a utilitarian purpose. While the use of sealing techniques may have been limited to ecclesiastic and the nobility, letterlocking was historically performed by all classes of writers. An individual could also be recognised by their personal technique of folding, as was the case with Jane Whorwood, of whose letter Charles I of England wrote: "This Note [...] I know, by the fowldings [...] that it is written by [Mrs Whorwood]".

Letterlocking is also a discipline focusing on "the materially engineered security and privacy of letters, both as a technology and a historically evolving tradition."

Collections
The Brienne Collection is a postmaster's trunk of undelivered letters from various places in Europe sent to The Hague, the Netherlands, between 1689 and 1706. The letters were held by the postmaster because, at that time, the recipient was required to pay for delivery and the postmaster kept the letters in the hope that the intended recipient would pay for delivery at a later date. These letters were therefore letters for which the intended recipient never paid for delivery and so therefore never received the remaining letters. The trunk contains about 2,600 folded letters, of which about 600 have been unsealed and studied. The collection is held by the Dutch museum Image and Sound The Hague, which encompasses the former Dutch postal museum.

Research advancements
In March 2021 the journal Nature Communications reported that a team of researchers from the Massachusetts Institute of Technology used computational techniques to "virtually unfold" letters from the Brienne Collection, using technology similar to that used for investigating similarly delicate scrolls, books, and other folded documents. The digitally unfolded letter, sealed since 1697 and secured by eight folds, had been previously scanned using X-ray microtomography (XMT), a technology used in dental and other medical, industrial, and archeological research. While previous XMT efforts had involved algorithms to analyze and digitally flatten ancient scrolls, this research succeeded in interpreting complex, origami-like folds, and parts of letters slotted through and interlocked with other parts of the letters.

See also
 Letter sheet
 Letters close

References

External links
 Methods from the Envelope and Letter Folding Association. The Envelope and Letter Folds Association (ELFA) is an informal organization of enthusiasts founded in 1988-89 and which at one time had local groups in the Netherlands, Belgium, and Germany.
 
  
  
  
 Letterlocking video channel on Youtube; demonstration of techniques including those found in the Brienne Collection postal archive. 
  
 

Cultural heritage
Conservation and restoration of cultural heritage
Letters (message)
Postal history
Philately